John Maurice Fitzroy (20 March 1897 – 7 May 1976) was an English cricketer who played for Northamptonshire from 1925 to 1927. 

He appeared in 56 first-class matches, all as Northamptonshire's captain. He was an attacking lower-order batsman who scored 1,373 runs with a highest score of 50 and took six wickets with a best performance of four for 14. He was also noted for his fielding.

Fitzroy was the youngest son of Edward FitzRoy, Speaker of the House of Commons from 1928 to his death in 1943. Maurice changed his surname to Fitzroy Newdegate in 1936. His wife Lucia, the daughter of Francis Newdegate, had inherited the Arbury Hall estate from her father, and changing the surname was part of the deal. Their son was Francis FitzRoy Newdegate, 3rd Viscount Daventry, who inherited from Maurice Fitzroy's oldest brother the viscountcy that had been granted in 1943 to Speaker FitzRoy's widow.

Notes

External links
 Maurice Fitzroy at Cricinfo

1897 births
1976 deaths
English cricketers
Northamptonshire cricketers
Cricketers from Chelsea, London
Northamptonshire cricket captains
Younger sons of viscounts